Sandbagging, hiding the strength, skill or difficulty of something or someone early in an engagement, refer to: 
  in golf and other games, deliberately playing below one's actual ability in order to fool opponents into accepting higher stakes bets, or to lower one's competitive rating in order to play in a future event with a higher handicap and consequently have a better chance to win
Sandbagging (grappling), competing in a skill-bracket or being ranked lower than one is deemed capable of
 Sandbagging (racing), deliberately qualifying slower than what the car can actually perform
 Slow play (poker), deceptive play in poker
 Sandbagging (law), suing for a breach of a contractual representation or warranty despite having known at the time of the contract that it was untrue.
 Sandbagging (professional wrestling), to not cooperate with a throw and to act as dead weight, which makes the moves the wrestler is attempting much harder, if not impossible to pull off.

See also
The Sandbaggers, a British TV series from the late 1970s